The Eastern Argus was a newspaper published in Portland, Maine, United States from 1803 to January 1921. In early 1921, it was succeeded by the Portland Press Herald.

History 
The newspaper was founded by Calvin Day and Nathaniel Willis. Its offices, along with the offices of all the newspapers in the city, were destroyed on July 4, 1866 in the Great Fire of 1866. At the time of its closure, it was the "oldest newspaper in Maine published continuously without change of name." Among those with a business interest in the paper at that time were Don Carlos Seitz and Ernest C. Bowler. It was owned by the Independent Publishing Company.

Journalists 
Prominent editors and journalists employed by the Eastern Argus included John Adams, Thomas Haskell, and Seba Smith.

Editorial positions
In 1803 “gentlemen of the Republican party” invited Nathaniel P. Willis, father of the widely acclaimed journalist Nathaniel Parker Willis, to move from Boston to Portland to establish the Eastern Argus “in opposition to the Federalists.” The paper was friendly to the French Revolution and opposed the Federalist Party. Later, it was friendly to the Democratic Party. It was strongly in favor of separation of Maine from Massachusetts and the formation of the U.S. state of Maine, which was accomplished in 1820.

References

Newspapers published in Portland, Maine
Defunct newspapers published in Maine
Publications established in 1803
Publications disestablished in 1921
1803 establishments in Maine
1921 disestablishments in Maine